Philosophical Studies is a peer-reviewed academic journal for philosophy in the analytic tradition. The journal is devoted to the publication of papers in exclusively analytic philosophy and welcomes papers applying formal techniques to philosophical problems. It was established in 1950 by Herbert Feigl and Wilfrid Sellars. Starting in 1972, publication was assumed by D. Reidel. It is currently published by Springer, a corporate heir of D. Reidel.

Abstracting and indexing
The journal is abstracted and indexed in Academic OneFile, Academic Search, Arts & Humanities Citation Index, ProQuest, Current Contents/Arts and Humanities, EBSCO databases, FRANCIS, International Bibliography of Periodical Literature, Mathematical Reviews, MLA International Bibliography, Scopus, Summon by Serial Solutions, and The Philosopher's Index.
The journal ranked in the top ten of all general philosophy journals in an unscientific poll of philosophers conducted in 2012.
It also ranked in the top ten in a later unscientific poll of philosophers ranking general and specialist journals together that was conducted in 2013.

See also
 List of philosophy journals

References

External links
 

Philosophy journals
Springer Science+Business Media academic journals
Publications established in 1950
English-language journals
Analytic philosophy literature
Contemporary philosophical literature
Philosophy Documentation Center academic journals
Journals published between 13 and 25 times per year